Leucotaenius is a genus of tropical air-breathing land snails, terrestrial pulmonate gastropod mollusks in the family Acavidae.

Distribution 
This genus occurs in Madagascar.

Species
Species within this genus Leucotaenius include:
 Leucotaenius favannii

References

Acavidae